The 1930 FIFA World Cup final was a football tournament match that culminated in the inaugural 1930 FIFA World Cup champions. Uruguay and Argentina contested in what was a rematch of the gold medal match of the 1928 Olympics, which Uruguay won after a replay.

The final was played at the Estadio Centenario in Montevideo, Uruguay, on 30 July, a Wednesday. It was one of only two World Cup finals to be played on a day other than Sunday, the other being the 1966 FIFA World Cup final, which was played on a Saturday. A disagreement overshadowed the build-up to the match as which team would provide the match ball. FIFA intervened with a compromise, that Argentina would provide the ball for the first half, and Uruguay for the second.

The stadium gates were opened at eight in the morning, six hours before kick-off, and at noon the ground was full, officially holding 93,000 people. Uruguay successfully "defended" its Olympic gold medal achievement 4–2, coming back from a 2–1 deficit at half-time. 

Uruguay manager Alberto Suppici was 31 at the time, and still holds the record for being youngest coach of a FIFA World Cup winning team. Jules Rimet, president of FIFA, presented Uruguay with the World Cup Trophy, later to be named after him. The following day was declared a national holiday in Uruguay. In Buenos Aires, a mob threw stones at the Uruguayan consulate.

The last living player from the final was Argentine striker Francisco Varallo, who died on 30 August 2010 at the age of 100. The last living Uruguayan from the final was Ernesto Mascheroni, who died on 3 July 1984 at the age of 76.

Route to the final

Match

Summary
After 12 minutes, Pablo Dorado put the hosts into the lead, before Argentina winger Carlos Peucelle equalised 8 minutes later, beating goalkeeper Enrique Ballestrero with a powerful shot. In the 37th minute, tournament top scorer Guillermo Stábile gave Argentina a 2–1 lead going into the break. Uruguay leveled the score 12 minutes into the second half via a goal from Pedro Cea, and took the lead back for good with a Santos Iriarte goal in the 68th minute. With a minute remaining, Héctor Castro put Uruguay up 4–2, sealing victory in the inaugural World Cup.

Details

See also
 Argentina–Uruguay football rivalry

References

External links

 1930 FIFA World Cup final fifa.com

Final
FIFA World Cup finals
Uruguay national football team matches
Argentina national football team matches
Final
Final
Argentina–Uruguay football rivalry
FIFA World Cup Final
World Cup Final